Calliope Tatti was born in Thessaloniki, Ottoman Empire in 1894. Great-granddaughter of  Constantine Tattis who was member of the secret Greek society Filiki Eteria which in early 19th century organized the successful Greek War of Independence against the Ottoman Empire. Spouse of the Cretan gendarmerie officer Evangelos Sarris. After his premature death in 1917 she got married in 1922 to the chairman of the BAR association of Thessaloniki George Seremetis who was one of the most prominent attorneys in the city. He later served as mayor of the same city. 

Calliope Tatti studied at the English school of Thessaloniki during the years of the Ottoman administration. She spoke fluently English, French, Turkish and Greek.

Thessaloniki was captured by the Hellenic Army under Crown Prince Constantine during the first year of the First Balkan War (1912). Tatti immediately after the capture of Thessaloniki she volunteered to serve as a nurse in the hospital organized by the "Central City School" that was taking care of the wounded soldiers during both Balkan Wars.
From her two marriages she had three sons, the first Constantine Sarris from the first husband and the two others from the second (Dimitrios Seremetis and Michael Seremetis). The first 2 sons became lawyers and practiced law in Thessaloniki and the third one became a physician (thoracic surgeon) who was trained and practiced in the United States.

She participated to a great number of charitable associations with considerable social service in Thessaloniki. She served as vice-president and later chairman of the “-Phoenix” charitable association (1933-1941) and the "Philoptochos Fraternity of Thessaloniki ladies" (1940-1950). 

She offered a great deal of her own financial resources for the relief of her fellow-citizens during the starvation period of the German occupation (1941–1944). 

She died in September 1978.

1894 births
1978 deaths
People in health professions from Thessaloniki
Female wartime nurses
Ottoman Thessalonica
Greek nurses